Marianne Aspelin (married name Berntzen, 4 April 1966 in Lørenskog) is a Norwegian curler and World Champion. She won a gold medal at the 1991 World Curling Championships.

References

External links

1966 births
Living people
Norwegian female curlers
World curling champions
Curlers at the 1988 Winter Olympics
Curlers at the 1992 Winter Olympics
People from Lørenskog
European curling champions
Sportspeople from Viken (county)